Puerto Rico Highway 42 (PR-42) is an urban road in Santurce. This is a short road that connects from the PR-39 (Calle Cerra) to Lafayette Street and intersects with PR-2. It is parallel to the PR-35 (Avenida Manuel Fernández Juncos) and PR-25 (Avenida Juan Ponce de León). This road is called Calle Las Palmas.

Major intersections

See also

 List of highways numbered 42
 List of streets in San Juan, Puerto Rico

References

External links
 

042
Roads in San Juan, Puerto Rico